Xanaguía Zapotec (Diidz Zë) is a Zapotec language of Oaxaca, Mexico.

References

Zapotec languages